The 2000 AFC U-16 Championship was the 9th AFC U-16 Championship, which was held between 3 and 17 September 2000 in Vietnam. Oman defeated Iran in the final round.

Qualification

Group 1 : 
Group 2 : 
Group 3 : 
Group 4 : 
Group 5 : 
Group 6 : 
Group 7 : 
Group 8 : 
Group 9 : 
Host :

Venue
All matches were held in Da Nang, Vietnam.

Group stage

Group A

Group B

Knockout stage

Semi finals

Third place match

Final

Winners

Teams qualifying for the 2001 FIFA U-17 World Championship

X-ray tests and bans
In May 2001, 16 players were banned from international football for 2 years following X-ray tests that suggested they were at least 19 years old. Of the teams involved, Oman had 6 players banned, Iran 5, Bangladesh 3 and Thailand 2. Nepal did not allow its players to be tested. These five teams were banned from the next edition of the tournament.

Despite the disciplines, the final results of the tournament were not changed due to the draws were already taken place before the ban and the finalists Iran and Oman both participated in the 2001 FIFA U-17 World Championship. At the tournament held in Trinidad and Tobago, both sides failed to make it past the group stage as well as Japan, with Iran losing every match they played and Oman only drawing once.

References
 RSSSF Archive

 
Under
International association football competitions hosted by Vietnam
AFC U-16 Championship, 2000
2000 in youth association football
AFC U-16 Championships